John F. Raper, Jr. (June 13, 1913 – June 10, 1993) was a justice of the Wyoming Supreme Court from December 18, 1974, to June 14, 1983.

Born in Mapleton, Iowa, Raper received his Juris Doctor from the University of Wyoming in 1936 and undertook the practice of law in Sheridan, Wyoming.

He served from 1937 to 1960 in the Wyoming Army National Guard, where he became a colonel. He was in the 115th Cavalry Regiment and during the Korean War, he was the commander of the 300th Armored Field Artillery Battalion, known as the "Cowboy Cannoneers". While in Korea, the 300th Armored Field Artillery Battalion fought with distinction and earned the Distinguished Unit Citation.

He also maintained his law practice into the 1950s.

In 1954, Raper was appointed United States Attorney for Wyoming.
 
He was then Wyoming Attorney General, and a Wyoming district court judge until he was appointed by to the Wyoming Supreme Court, on December 18, 1974, by Governor Stanley K. Hathaway. Raper served until his retirement, on June 14, 1983.

After a decade in retirement, Raper died in Cheyenne, Wyoming on June 10, 1993. Having also been a colonel in the Wyoming National Guard, the National Guard armory in Cheyenne is named for him.

References

1913 births
1993 deaths
Justices of the Wyoming Supreme Court
20th-century American lawyers
County judges in the United States
National Guard (United States) colonels
People from Mapleton, Iowa
University of Wyoming College of Law alumni
United States Army personnel of the Korean War
United States Attorneys for the District of Wyoming
Wyoming lawyers
Wyoming Republicans
Wyoming Attorneys General
Wyoming National Guard personnel
20th-century American judges
Military personnel from Iowa